Picchi (meaning "peaks" or "woodpecker") is an Italian surname:
 Armando Picchi (1935 – 1971), Italian football player and coach
 Giorgio Picchi (1586 - 1599), Italian painter
 Giovanni Picchi (1571 or 1572 – 17 May 1643), Italian composer
 Guglielmo Picchi (1973 - ), Italian politician
 Mario Picchi, Italian religious leader, founder of Centro Italiano di Solidarietà (CeIS) to combat drug addiction and promote wellness (see Streetwise priests)
 Mirto Picchi (1915 - 1980), Italian dramatic tenor
 Armando Picchi Calcio, Italian association football club in Livorno
 Stadio Armando Picchi, stadium in Livorno, Italy

Italian-language surnames